The Mayor of Dudelange is the mayor of the Luxembourgian commune and city of Dudelange.

List of Mayors

Footnotes

References
  Bourgmestres depuis 1797.  Dudelange official website.  Retrieved on 2006-09-02.

 
Dudelange